Semperdon xyleborus is a species of small, air-breathing land snails, terrestrial pulmonate gastropod mollusks in the family Charopidae. This species is endemic to Palau.

References

Fauna of Palau
Semperdon
Taxonomy articles created by Polbot